The 2007 Utah State Aggies football team represented Utah State University as a member of the Western Athletic Conference (WAC) in 2007 NCAA Division I FBS football season. The Aggies were led by third-year head coach Brent Guy and played their home games in Romney Stadium in Logan, Utah. The Aggies finished the season 2–10 overall and 2–6 in WAC play to place fifth.

Schedule

References

Utah State
Utah State Aggies football seasons
Utah State Aggies football